Kuang-hsiao Temple may refer to:

 Guangxiao Temple (Guangzhou), in Guangzhou, Guangdong, China
 Guangxiao Temple (Putian), in Putian, Fujian, China
 Guangxiao Temple (Jian'ou), in Jian'ou, Fujian, China
 Guangxiao Temple (Taizhou), in Taizhou, Jiangsu, China